The 1938 Wightman Cup was the 16th edition of the annual women's team tennis competition between the United States and Great Britain. It was held on 10 and 11 June at the All England Lawn Tennis and Croquet Club in London, United Kingdom.

References

Wightman Cups by year
Wightman Cup, 1938
Wightman Cup
Wightman Cup
Wightman Cup
Wightman Cup